The Yanjing Beer 2014 Chinese FA Cup (Chinese: 燕京啤酒2014中国足球协会杯) was the 16th edition of Chinese FA Cup.

The cup title sponsor is Beijing Yanjing Brewery.

Schedule

Qualifying rounds

Group A

Group B

Group C

Group D

First round

Second round

Third round

Fourth round

Fifth Round

Semifinal

1st Leg

2nd Leg

Shandong Luneng Taishan won 6–0 on aggregate.

Jiangsu Guoxin-Sainty won 5–0 on aggregate.

Final

Assistant referees:
 Huo Weiming
 Mu Yuxin
Fourth official:
Tan Hai

Assistant referees:
 A Lamusi
 Wang Dexin
Fourth official:
Wang Zhe

Shandong Luneng Taishan won 5–4 on aggregate.

Awards 
 Top Scorer:  Xiao Zhi (Henan Jianye) (5 goals)
 Most Valuable Player:  Ryan McGowan (Shandong Luneng Taishan)
 Best Coach:  Dan Petrescu
 Fair Play Award: Qingdao Hainiu
 Dark Horse Award: Wuhan Hongxing

Top scorers

External links
 Regulations of 2014 Chinese FA Cup

References

2014
2014 in Chinese football
2014 domestic association football cups
Jiangsu F.C. matches